Historic District F is a national historic district located at Boonville, Cooper County, Missouri.  It encompasses 40 contributing buildings in a predominantly residential section of Boonville.  The district includes representative examples of Greek Revival and Late Victorian style architecture.  Notable buildings include the Gann-Ruddell Residence (1840–70, 1906), Weed Residence (1897), Weed Residence (1860s-1870s), Embry Residence (1853), Foursquare Gospel Church (1852, 1956), Heyssel Residence (1860s), Hayes Residence (1892-1900), Earhart Residence (1899), Maplewood Apartment (1892), and Smith/Whitehurse Residence (1850s-1860s).

It was listed on the National Register of Historic Places in 1983.

References

Historic districts on the National Register of Historic Places in Missouri
Greek Revival architecture in Missouri
Victorian architecture in Missouri
National Register of Historic Places in Cooper County, Missouri
Boonville, Missouri